A medical education manager is someone who is appointed by a committee of deaneries and trusts in a department of a medical college. A medical education manager generally has a medical degree and a medical specialty, and is a staff physician. Their job is to determine the curriculum for training of the other students or physicians in that department.

"Medical education manager" may also refer to a position in some pharmaceutical companies (e.g. Johnson & Johnson in British Columbia, Canada) which requires health science, life science, business, or other science degrees. It also may be called Medical Education Specialist, Healthcare Communications Specialist, or Continuing Medical Education Specialist. The job is generally to leverage the information of the health care professionals regarding the new studies about the produced medications.

References

Education and training occupations
Health care occupations